Eterna Magia is a Brazilian telenovela produced and broadcast by Globo. It premiered on 14 May 2007, replacing O Profeta, and ended on 2 November 2007, replaced by Desejo Proibido. The series is written by Elizabeth Jhin, with the collaboration of Eliane Garcia, Fernando Rebello, Lílian Garcia, and Júlio Fischer.

It stars Malu Mader, Thiago Lacerda, Maria Flor, Werner Schunemann, Eliane Giardini, Cássia Kis, Luís Melo, and Irene Ravache.

Cast 

 Malu Mader as Eva O'Brian Sullivan
 Thiago Lacerda as Conrado O'Neill
 Maria Flor as Marina "Nina" Rosa O'Brian Sullivan O'Neill
 Cássia Kis as Zilda Pelizari
 Anna Rita Cerqueira as Clara Sullivan O'Neill
 Eliane Giardini as Pérola O'Brian Sullivan
 Werner Schunemann as Maximillian "Max" Sullivan
 Irene Ravache as Loreta O'Neill
 Milena Toscano as Elisa Pelizari
 Cauã Reymond as Lucas Finnegan
 Thiago Rodrigues as Flávio Falcão / Ebdimon
 Luís Melo as Dr. Rafael Pelizari
 Osmar Prado as Joaquim O'Neill
 Aracy Balabanian as Inácia Finnegan
 Cleyde Yáconis as Dona Chica
 Rita Guedes as Matilde Sotero O'Neill
 Chris Couto as Eglantina Adams
 Pierre Kiwitt as Peter Gallagher
 Paulo Coelho as Mago Simon
 Bel Kutner as Roberta "Bertha" Fontes
 Isabelle Drummond as Angelina "Gina" Ferreira O'Neill
 Lara Rodrigues as Tereza "Teca" Ferreira O'Neill
 Thiago de Los Reyes as Bruno Finnegan
 Ana Carolina Godóy as Maria Carolina "Carol" O'Neill
 Marco Pigossi as Miguel Finnegan
 Tainá Müller as Laura Mascarenhas
 Emiliano Queiroz as Padre Agnaldo
 Isaac Bardavid as José Carlos "Zequinha" Finnegan
 Lívia Falcão as Flora O'Ryen
 Carl Schumacher as Carlos "Carlão" O'Ryen
 Daniel Erthal as Nicolau Betti
 Maurício Gonçalves as José Antônio "Padre Zuza"
 Nizo Neto as Brasil
 Eduardo Mancini as Gonzaga
 Marcelo Saback as Jair Ferreira
 Bia Sion as Evelyn
 Miryam Thereza as Tia Edméia
 Beatriz Tragtenberg as Tia Neném
 Nica Bonfim as Sofia
 Marcela Rosis as Nora
 Caetano O'Maihlan as Oscar
 Marc Franken as Bento
 Fernanda Biancamanno as Célia "Celinha" O'Ryen
 Pedro Garcia Netto as Bernardo
 Fábio Keldani as Mauro
 Marcella Valente as Joyce
 Cláudio Andrade as William
 Maria Clara Mattos as Rita
 Rodrigo Guimarães as Jonathan
 Rogério Faria as Antônio
 Vivian Pimentel as Molly
 Rick Garcia as Tomás
 Izak Dahora as Tadeu
 Rafael Ritto as Severino O'Ryen
 Júlia Oliva as Aninha
 Guillermo Hundadze as Joaquim O'Neill Ferreira "Qunizinho"

Reception

Awards and nominations

References

External links 
 

2007 telenovelas
TV Globo telenovelas
Brazilian telenovelas
2007 Brazilian television series debuts
2007 Brazilian television series endings
2000s Brazilian television series
Portuguese-language telenovelas
Television series about witchcraft